Estero de San Antonio State Marine Recreational Management Area (SMRMA) is a marine protected area 1.5 miles north of Dillon Beach in Marin County on California’s north central coast.  The marine protected area covers 0.09 square miles.  Estero de San Antonio SMRMA prohibits the take of all living marine resources, except the recreational hunting of waterfowl, unless otherwise restricted by hunting regulations.

History

Estero de San Antonio SMRMA is one of 22 marine protected areas adopted by the California Department of Fish and Game in August 2009, during the second phase of the  Marine Life Protection Act Initiative.  The MLPAI is a collaborative public process to create a statewide network of protected areas along California’s coastline.

The north central coast’s new marine protected areas were designed by local divers, fishermen, conservationists and scientists who comprised the North Central Coast Regional Stakeholder Group.  Their job was to design a network of protected areas that would preserve sensitive sea life and habitats while enhancing recreation, study and education opportunities.

The north central coast marine protected areas took effect on May 1, 2010.

Geography and natural features

Estero de San Antonio SMRMA is a marine protected area 1.5 miles north of Dillon Beach in Marin County on California’s north central coast.  The Estero springs just north of the Marin-Sonoma county line and meanders south and west until emptying into Bodega Bay.

Estero de San Antonio SMRMA includes the waters below the mean high tide line within Estero de San Antonio westward of longitude 122° 57.40' W.

Habitat and wildlife

The Estero de San Antonio has a variety of habitat types, including freshwater ponds, mudflats, eelgrass and saltgrass areas, and wooded ravines, including 923 acres of associated wetlands.  Tidewater goby, Ghost shrimp and Mud shrimp, as well as significant seabird aggregations and other species depend upon this habitat.  In the summer or early fall, a sandbar often forms at the mouth of the Estero, damming it until the winter rains arrive.

Recreation and nearby attractions

Doran Regional Park, one mile south of Bodega Bay, provides a boat launch and campgrounds, while Salmon Creek Beach to the north is the most popular surf spot in Sonoma County.

Estero de San Antonio SMRMA prohibits the take of all living marine resources, except the recreational hunting of waterfowl, unless otherwise restricted by hunting regulations.  However, California’s marine protected areas encourage recreational and educational uses of the ocean. Activities such as kayaking, diving, snorkeling, and swimming are allowed unless otherwise restricted.

Scientific monitoring

As specified by the Marine Life Protection Act, select marine protected areas along California’s central coast are being monitored by scientists to track their effectiveness and learn more about ocean health. Similar studies in marine protected areas located off of the Santa Barbara Channel Islands have already detected gradual improvements in fish size and number.

References

External links 
Marine Life Protection Act Initiative
CalOceans
Sonoma Coast State Park
Doran Regional Park
Estero de San Antonio

National Seashores of the United States
Parks in Marin County, California
Marine sanctuaries in California